Ezzahra is a coastal city on the outskirts of Tunis located south of the capital. Ezzahra is bounded by the Mediterranean Sea and the municipalities of Rades, Hammam Lif and Boumhel EL-Bassatine. Administratively attached to the governorate of Ben Arous, it is the seat of a delegation and a municipality of 31,792 inhabitants (in 2014) while the city itself has a population of 6000 inhabitants. The municipality of Ezzahra consists of four cities: Ezzahra, El Habib, 18 January and Borj El-Louzir.

History 
The municipality was founded September 10, 1909, during the colonial period, under the name of Saint-Germain and was subsequently referred Ezzahra after the independence of Tunisia in honor of national fighter Lazhar Chraïti (1919-1963).

Culture 
Ezzahra organizes a theater festival each summer. It also has a basketball club (Ezzahra Sports) among the best in Tunisia and there also is two of the oldest elementary schools and high schools in Tunisia (Al Jomhouriya Avenue Elementary School) and (Ibn Rachik High School).

Ezzahra is also the birthplace of the Tunisian progressive metal band Myrath and the place of residency of the prodigies Razi Bouallagui, Mariem Allani and the Haddad family. It is also the hometown of Entrepreneur and Simplivity Leader Marouene Trabelsi also known as the Magnificent.

See also
List of cities in Tunisia

References

Populated places in Ben Arous Governorate
Communes of Tunisia
Tunisia geography articles needing translation from French Wikipedia